Lady Alice Sophia Acland (3 February 1849 – 5 July 1935) was the founder, the first General Secretary and the first president of the Co-operative Women's Guild.

Personal life
Alice Acland was born on 3 February 1849 to Reverend Francis Macaulay Cunningham and Alice Charlotte Poore. She grew up in Hampshire and Oxford, and received a church education.  She married Sir Arthur Dyke Acland, 13th Baronet on 14 June 1873, with whom she later had two sons and a daughter.

Role in the Co-operative Women's Guild
Alice's husband was an advocate for educational opportunities for working-class men.  She travelled with him on speaking tours which led to her own involvement in providing more opportunities for working-class women. She noted the value of The Cooperative Movement and its potential to provide opportunities for women, as women held purchasing power for their households.

Acland began writing articles about women's lives for Cooperative News.  On 6 January 1883, Cooperative News editor Samuel Bamford created the column Women's Corner and appointed Acland as editor. Her first appeal set in motion women's role in the Cooperative movement, stating:

Her column's popularity led to coordination of the Women's League for the Spread of Co-operation, soon after renamed the Co-operative Women's Guild. Formation of a central board and meeting space for women was proposed in a letter to Women's Corner from "M.L. Woolwich", a pseudonym of Mary Lawrenson who became a co-founder of the Guild. The Guild was formally inaugurated in June 1883. Acland served as General Secretary of the guild in 1883, but resigned from the position due to ill-health. She served as President from 1884–1886, again resigning due to further health problems.

References

1849 births
1935 deaths
Co-operative Women's Guild
Feminism in the United Kingdom
People from Petersfield
Wives of baronets
19th-century British women
20th-century British people
20th-century British women